is a Japanese futsal club, currently playing in the F. League Division 2, the league second tier. The team is located in Kobe, Hyogo Prefecture, Japan. Their home ground is Kobe Green Arena.

Chronicle

Trophies 
none

External links 

Futsal clubs in Japan
Futsal clubs established in 1993
1993 establishments in Japan